José Antonio Navarro (February 27, 1795 – January 13, 1871) was a Texas statesman, revolutionary, rancher, and merchant. The son of Ángel Navarro and Josefa María Ruiz y Peña, he was born into a distinguished noble family at San Antonio de Béxar in the Viceroyalty of New Spain (now the American city of San Antonio, Texas). His uncle was José Francisco Ruiz and his brother-in-law was Juan Martín de Veramendi.

Navarro County, Texas, established in 1846, is named in his honor, as is the small town of Navarro, Texas.

Early life and career
Navarro was proficient in the laws of Mexico and Spain, although he was mainly self-educated. As a native Texan, he had a vision of the future of Texas like that of Stephen F. Austin.  Austin and he developed a steady friendship, and worked together to found the new state of Texas. An early proponent of Texas independence, he took part in the 1812–1813 Magee, Gutiérrez, and Toledo resistance movements.

Working with the empresarios of the period, he helped  Austin obtain his contracts to bring settlers into the area. He became a land commissioner for Dewitt's Colony, and soon after, for the Béxar District. In 1825, he married Margarita de la Garza and they raised seven children. His son José Ángel Navarro III served three terms in the Texas Legislature.

During the early 1830s, Navarro represented Texas both in the legislature of the state of Coahuila y Tejas and in the federal Congress in Mexico City. Always a champion of democratic ideas, Navarro, collaborating with Austin, worked to pass legislation that would best benefit the people of Texas.

Navarro later served as a leader in the Texas Revolution. He was at the Convention for Texas Independence, when he received the news from Juan Seguin of the Alamo's fall.  With the death of James Bowie (his nephew by marriage), Navarro had to secure the release of the surviving Navarros, two women and a child, who were being held by the Mexicans at the Músquiz house. They were removed to the Navarro family home. The surviving noncombatants  thereby avoided humiliation or death from General Antonio López de Santa Anna.

José Antonio Navarro was one of the first signers of the Texas Declaration of Independence, in early March, 1836, in Washington-on-the-Brazos. He later signed the Constitution of the Republic of Texas.
 
In 1841, Navarro reluctantly participated in the ill-conceived Texan Santa Fe Expedition sent by President Mirabeau B. Lamar, when he tried to persuade the residents of New Mexico to secede from Mexico and join with Texas. He was captured, put on trial, sentenced to death, and imprisoned for years. He escaped with the help of sympathetic Mexican Army officials, sailing back to Texas.

José Antonio Navarro became a representative in the Republic of Texas Congress from Bexar County, Texas. Attempting to keep a balance of power, he worked closely with Senator Juan Seguin to promote legislation favorable to the Tejano citizenry, who were quickly becoming the political minority. Education was one such priority, working to bring academic institutions into the San Antonio area. He supported the annexation of Texas by the United States. In 1845, Navarro was instrumental in drafting the first state Constitution of Texas, ensuring future political rights for all people. He served two terms in the Texas Senate before retiring from politics in 1849.

Slave ownership
Like a number of other Tejanos, Navarro owned enslaved African-Americans. Between 1856 and 1864, he owned between six and nine enslaved people. As a legislator in the Mexican state of Coahuila y Tejas, Navarro introduced a bill known as the "Law of Contracts" which allowed enslaved people to be brought to Texas as indentured servants under contract, working to pay their debt in labor to their owners. Census records indicate that as early as 1850, Navarro owned an enslaved twelve-year-old boy named Henry.

Later life
In his retirement, Navarro wrote several historical and political essays about Texas and San Antonio's role in the Mexican Independence movement for the San Antonio Ledger.

Ranching occupied much of his time in later years, and he spent most of each spring, summer, and fall on the  San Geronimo Ranch, rich grasslands near Seguin, Texas, about 35 miles east of San Antonio.

Navarro later sold his ranch and lived full-time in San Antonio, where he died in 1871.

Legacy
In 1846, the Texas Legislature named Navarro County south of Dallas to honor his service. In 1848, Navarro County's seat of government was founded, and José Navarro selected the name, Corsicana, for the town.

A state historical marker identifies his Geronimo Creek Ranch in South Texas. Navarro Street in downtown San Antonio is also named for him.

Casa Navarro State Historic Site in San Antonio is the original residence complex of  José Antonio Navarro. He first bought the property, about 1.5 acres, in 1832 (during the Mexican Texas period. The structures of limestone, caliche block, and adobe were built over the next 20 years or so. The site is situated in the heart of old San Antonio. The buildings were acquired and restored by the San Antonio Conservation Society, and the complex, including his one-story limestone home, kitchen, and a two-story store and offices, was opened to the public in October 1997.

Tejanos who served under Juan Seguín

References

Further reading and viewing

 David McDonald, Jose Antonio Navarro: In Search of the American Dream in Nineteenth-Century Texas, Texas State Historical Association, 2011.
 Defending Mexican Valor in Texas: Jose Antonio Navarro's Historical Writings, 1853–1857, Jose Antonio Navarro, David R. McDonald, Timothy M. Matovina, State House Press, October 1995, .
 In Storms of Fortune: The Public Life of José Antonio Navarro, written by Anastacio Bueno, M.A. thesis, University of Texas at San Antonio, 1978.
 Jose Antonio Navarro, co-creator of Texas, Baylor University Press, 1969, 127 pages, ASIN: B0006CAIBS.
 Remember the Alamo, American Experience; PBS documentary program (video recording), 2004.\==Further reading and viewing==

External links
Biography of José Antonio Navarro, written by an Old Texan, published 1876 and hosted by the Portal to Texas History
 
Read Jose Antonio Navarro's entry in the Biographical Encyclopedia of Texas hosted by the Portal to Texas History.
PBS American Experience, People & Events: José Antonio Navarro (1795–1871) 

1795 births
1871 deaths
Tejano slave owners
People of Spanish Texas
People of the Texas Revolution
Texas state senators
Businesspeople from San Antonio
People of Texas in the American Civil War
American people of Spanish descent
People from Seguin, Texas
American people of Corsican descent
American city founders
Navarro County, Texas
19th-century American politicians
Signers of the Texas Declaration of Independence
Tejano politicians
American people of Italian descent